Treburley is a village in Cornwall, England, UK, split by the A388 road leading from Callington to Launceston. Treburley is in the valley of the River Inny about a mile south-southeast of Lezant.

References

Villages in Cornwall